The November 2020 Station 19 and Grey's Anatomy crossover event is a three-part fictional crossover within the television franchise. The event aired on the American Broadcasting Company consecutively in a three-hour timeslot on November 12, 2020. It began with "Nothing Seems the Same" of Station 19, continued with "All Tomorrow's Parties" of Grey's Anatomy, and concluded with "The Center Won't Hold", also of Grey's Anatomy. The event served as the fourth season premiere of Station 19 and seventeenth season premiere, as well as the second episode of the seventeenth season of Grey's Anatomy.

All three episodes followed a unified storyline of children involved in a car accident and the rescue and treatment of the victims. Paris Barclay directed the first part while Kiley Donovan wrote it. Debbie Allen directed both of the Grey's Anatomy episodes. Andy Reaser also co-wrote both of the Grey's Anatomy episodes while Lynee E. Litt co-wrote the first Grey's Anatomy episode and Jase Miles-Perez co-wrote the second. The event also marked the surprise and unpublicized return of Patrick Dempsey to Grey's Anatomy who last appeared in the series in 2015. It was watched live by an average of 6.25 million viewers throughout the three-hour period and received positive reviews from critics.

Plot

Part 1: "Nothing Seems the Same"
Station 19 deals with the effects of COVID-19. Meanwhile, the aid car deals with treating child victims involved in a car accident while returning from a party. Things get complicated when the car catches fire and quickly turns into a small forest fire. Sullivan deals with being fired from the Seattle Fire Department and has trouble settling into his new job. Also, Andy continues to process the news that her mother is still alive and she is still grieving the death of her father.

Part 2: "All Tomorrow's Parties"
In April 2020, Grey-Sloan Memorial is in the midst of the COVID-19 pandemic. Richard returns to work and becomes accustomed to the new protocols and changes enforced at the hospital. Tom welcomes Richard back and tells him and Bailey that he ordered more masks and face shields for the hospital staff. Bailey struggles to find a solution for properly clean everyone's PPE (Personal Protection Equipment). Luckily, Richard is able to use the UV light device — that Bailey presented him earlier as a machine used to clean rooms — to disinfect all the masks. Meredith is feeling the impact of the pandemic as many of her patients are dying alone, and is becoming more and more frustrated. When Station 19 brings in teenagers from a wildfire, Owen and Jackson tend to them, along with Jo. Flashback. Jo tries to get over Alex by attempting to sleep with Jackson, whose relationship with Vic ended after an awkward encounter with Harriet. However she cries while they are making out and Jackson calls it off. In the present, she tells him that she is mortified by what she did and realizes she isn’t ready to move on. Teddy continues to feel the tension between her and Owen as the hospital continue to hold resentment towards her. When the shipment of PPE arrives, Koracick, Teddy, and Maggie find that they only received booties, leaving Tom to take his frustration out on the boxes. In order to ease her anger of all of dying COVID patients, Meredith attempts to call Andrew, but to no avail. Flashback. Cindy Wright, DeLuca's patient who was being sex trafficked, returns to Grey-Sloan. Regardless of his manic episode, DeLuca goes to be with her. Cindy admits that she is from Arizona. Bailey calls the police and reunites her with her family. Later, Bailey, Richard, Meredith, and Carina hold an "intervention" for DeLuca. He breaks down and decides to accept help. In the present, DeLuca decides to return to Grey-Sloan and begins to work, helping out a distraught Meredith. Maggie continues her long-distance relationship with Dr. Winston Ndugu, as they struggle to admit they love each other. Upset by all the  COVID deaths, Schmitt attempts to confide in Nico about the whole situation. As they continue to wait for answers, the parents blame each other for the incident. A fight ensues with the parents and they injure Bailey in the process.

Part 3: "The Center Won't Hold"
The parents of the children involved in the car accident are treated after injuries from the fight during which Bailey also sustained an injury. Meanwhile, Catherine deals with tight hospital finances as a result of the pandemic. Tom gets demoted from his Chief of Chiefs position after accidentally ordering the wrong type of personal protective equipment; he later gets the news that he is COVID positive, even though he is not symptomatic. Richard and Catherine begin to rekindle their relationship. Teddy also tries to make amends with Owen who is still unable to forgive her. Meredith is found collapsed in a parking garage; in a hallucination dream she sees her dead husband Derek Shepherd on the beach.

Production
Station 19 filming began during the first week of September 2020. The first Grey's Anatomy episode began filming on September 8, 2020, after filming of the previous season was cut short due to the COVID-19 pandemic. Cast and crew members of both series were required to wear personal protective equipment on scene at all times and take mandatory COVID tests. All three episodes focused heavily on real world events including the COVID-19 pandemic.

The third episode of the crossover most notably features the surprised and unpublicized return of former series regular Patrick Dempsey as Derek Shepherd. Dempsey last appeared in the series in the eleventh season episode "How to Save a Life". The idea to bring Dempsey back to the series was ultimately revealed to be series star Ellen Pompeo's. Krista Vernoff, the Grey's Anatomy showrunner, revealed the difficulties of keeping Dempsey's return a secret:
 Dempsey said that he enjoyed filming the reunion scene and is expected to return for future episodes. Former head makeup designer Norman T. Leavitt returned to provide services for the scene.

On September 17, 2020, it was revealed that both Station 19 and Grey's Anatomy would premiere on November 12 in a two-part crossover event.

Cast and characters

Main

Notable guests

Reception

Viewing figures
Station 19 was watched live by 6.59 million viewers; Grey's Anatomy, which received a single number for the two-hour timeslot, was watched live by 5.92 million.

Critical response
While reviewing the first part of the crossover, Jessica Lerner from TV Fanatic said that the episode "was mostly positive" but that the main call of the week didn't work stating that "While it was clear the show was trying to send the message that we should be adhering to social distancing guidelines and wearing masks, it just felt heavy-handed. It felt more like a public service announcement than something that happened organically and detracted from the rest of the episode in how preachy it felt at times". Jasmine Blu from TV Fanatic also reviewed the second and third parts of the crossover saying the multiple storylines "made for a mishmash of confusion and too much crammed into the premiere" but also stated that the ending scene "delivered the shock of a lifetime with a fallen Meredith and a Derek sighting!".

Lincee Ray from Entertainment Weekly said that "the amount of content the Grey's Anatomy showrunners stuffed into two hours proves that they made good use of their time during lockdown". Reviewing everything as a whole, Maggie Fremont from Vulture said it "pretty much caught us up, even if very quickly, on where every character's drama from last season stands".

References

2020 American television episodes
Grey's Anatomy (season 17) episodes
Television crossover episodes
Television episodes about the COVID-19 pandemic
Television episodes directed by Paris Barclay